Muruqucha (Quechua muru blunt; mutilated; stained; pip, grain; smallpox, qucha lake, Hispanicized spelling Morococha) is a  mountain near a little lake of that name in the Andes of Peru. It is located in the Lima Region, Huaura Province, Santa Leonor District. It lies southeast of Chururuyuq and east of Chururu.

References

Mountains of Peru
Mountains of Lima Region
Lakes of Peru
Lakes of Pasco Region